The GEC-Marconi scientist deaths conspiracy theory claims that between 1982 and 1990 a number of British-based GEC-Marconi scientists and engineers who worked on the Sting Ray torpedo project and United States Strategic Defense Initiative-related projects died under mysterious circumstances.

The first deaths to gain widespread attention and be linked to the theory came in 1986-1987. In just about a year, six different scientists died in mysterious circumstances, three of whom had worked for the Marconi company, a subsidiary of the defence group General Electric Company. Most deaths were ruled suicides or accidents. One died after driving his car, which had been packed full of petrol containers, into a building. Another tied a rope to his neck and a tree and then drove off in a car. A third died of carbon monoxide poisoning in his garage. No links were found between them. At the time, some opposition lawmakers in the British parliament called for an investigation into the deaths.

Proponents of the conspiracy theory link the deaths like a James Bond-esque set of assassinations, variably blaming the Soviet spy agency KGB, American spies, or even British spies. Proponents of the theory claim that the deaths were linked because of the scientists working on the same few classified projects, although most of the scientists had not been working closely together and were working on separate, mostly unclassified, projects.

References

Newspapers

Books

Media

 "Grave Secrets," a 20/20 segment which aired on ABC; May 5, 1989.  Reported by Stone Phillips and available on the "20C History Project" YouTube channel.

Deaths in the United Kingdom
Cold War history of the United Kingdom
Guglielmo Marconi
Science and technology-related conspiracy theories
BAE Systems
General Electric Company